The Libyan Armed Forces or the Libyan Arab Armed Forces are, in principle, the state organisation responsible for the military defence of Libya, including ground, air and naval forces.

The original army under the Libyan monarchy of King Idris I was trained by the United Kingdom and the United States. Since Muammar Gaddafi rose to power in 1969, Libya received military assistance from the Soviet Union. The Libyan military fought in several wars, including the Libyan–Egyptian War (1977) and the Chadian–Libyan conflict (1978–1987). After the 2011 civil war and the fall of Gaddafi, the armed forces consisted mostly of local militias that were frequently created or ceased to be active and made temporary shifting alliances. During 2015–2018, after Khalifa Haftar was appointed in 2015 by the Libyan parliament in Tobruk as the supreme commander of the armed forces, he unified many militias into a regular hierarchical structure in the eastern part of Libya that became known as the core of the Libyan National Army (LNA). , the regular core of the LNA (about  soldiers) was complemented by Salafist militias and foreign mercenaries (about  soldiers). , the internationally recognised Government of National Accord (GNA) retained formal control of the militias nominally constituting the Libyan Army, while the Libyan Air Force was split into LNA and GNA controlled components. The naval and coast guard forces were mostly under GNA control. with some coastal patrol boats under LNA control. In 2021, all the armed forces branches (except for the Haftar's  forces) will under command of the new President of Libya, Mohamed al-Menfi from Government of National Unity after the Second Libyan Civil War ceasefire.

Kingdom of Libya (1951–1969)
The United Kingdom of Libya officially gained its independence from Italy on 24 December 1951. The kingdom was later renamed as the Kingdom of Libya in 1963. Under the Libyan monarchy, there existed a federal army and local provincial police forces. The U.S. State Department reported in 1957 that the army numbered 1,835 men, while the police forces had around 5,000–6,000. King Idris of Libya and his government relied on the police for internal security and were anxious to increase the size of the national army to 5,000 troops. The United Kingdom had the primary role of training the Libyan Army, but the United States also contributed to training a 1,035-man contingent and was considering taking responsibility for training the entire army. The U.S. also supplied the Royal Libyan Air Force, coming to an agreement in May 1957 to supply Libya with 10 Northrop F-5s.

Libyan Arab Republic and Libyan Arab Jamahiriya (1969–2011)

A group of young officers and soldiers led by Muammar Gaddafi overthrew King Idris in a coup d'etat on 1 September 1969. The King's nephew and heir presumptive, Crown Prince Hasan, was captured by the rebels and spent several years under house arrest.

The new Libyan Army under Gaddafi's Libyan Arab Republic fought a short border war with Egypt in July 1977, sent several thousand troops to support Idi Amin during the Uganda–Tanzania War in 1972 and again in 1978, and spent a decade trying to annex parts of northern Chad in 1978–1987.

The Libyan army was estimated to have 50,000 total troops as of 2009.

Transition period (2011–2014)
During the 2011–2014 transition period, the Libyan armed forces consisted mostly of a shifting ensemble of militias being created and dissolved and creating and dropping alliances.

Units

17th Thunderbolt Special Forces Brigade 
 based in Tripoli (2013).

27th Brigade 
Leader: Mohammed Buzeiud; trained at Bassingbourn Barracks, UK (2014)
 based in Tripoli (2013).

Second civil war (2014–2020)

, since the start of the Second Libyan Civil War in 2014, the Libyan armed forces, composed to a large degree of militias, have been partially led by the internationally recognised Government of National Accord (GNA) in Tripoli, while remaining highly divided between those nominally led by the GNA and those nominally led by Khalifa Haftar in command of the Libyan National Army (LNA) on behalf of the part of the national parliament in Tobruk. The forces included ground forces divided between the GNA-led Libyan Army (including militia coalitions such as the Tripoli Protection Force) and the LNA; the Libyan Air Force also divided between a GNA component and an LNA component; while the naval, and coast guard forces were mostly under GNA control with some coastal patrol boats under LNA control.

Prime Minister Fayez al-Sarraj, the head of the GNA, is nominally the supreme commander of the GNA forces. The military is under the authority of the GNA Ministry of Defense, formerly led by Colonel Al-Mahdi Al-Barghathi from 2016 to 2018, at which point Sarraj took over as defense minister.

During 2015–2018, the LNA under Haftar's control unified many militias into a regular hierarchical structure in the eastern part of Libya and used online social networks to present the image of growing military and political power, while still remaining, dominated by Salafist militias and foreign members. , the LNA consisted of about  regular soldiers and  militia and foreign members.

References

https://wikileaks.org/plusd/cables/1976TRIPOL01169_b.html - parade 1976

Military of Libya